The import scene, also known as the import racing scene or tuner scene, is a subculture of modifying mostly Japanese-import cars, particularly in the United States and Europe.

History
Car modifying has been popular among youths in the US, especially in Southern California, since the days of hot rods in the 1950s and 1960s. There is significant evidence indicating that import drag racing first started in Southern California in the mid-1960s, with modified Volkswagen Beetles, Ford Populars and Austin A40 Devons: Documentation of quarter-mile passes were published in Hot Rod Magazine as early as August 1965.

Puerto Rico also has a history of pioneering import drag racing in the mid-'70s and -'80s, and it is still a popular hobby on the island.

In the late 1970s and early 1980s, Japanese vehicles, mostly early smaller Hondas (Civic, Prelude), Toyotas  (Celica, Corolla, Supra), Nissans (Datsun 510) and Mazdas (RX-2, RX-3) gained popularity in Southern California. To be more precise, within the city of "Gardena" at a parking lot (location) for then what was called "Meiji (Japanese) Market or Meiji Market Plaza" along with a line of other authentic Japanese retailers serving the largely Japanese communities of Gardena, Torrance, and Palos Verdes was to become the " 1st known and established Weekend late-night meet-up location." The Young Asian-Americans and first generation "Issei" Japanese street racers from Japan and Okinawa played a particularly important role in the development of the early street racing scene. Many enthusiasts in southern California centered around the City of Gardena also began to modify their compact Japanese cars, following similar trends that originated in Japan, such as the paint schemes, modified exhausts, and engine carburation. As the Import racers and car aesthetics grew in popularity and numbers, so did the competition. Meiji Market's parking lot became very well known outside the original Japanese car crews and this attracted more outsiders to visit, as well as American Car race Crews to appear, which inevitably became somewhat problematic. This local Import Racers scene became a hotbed for pink slip racing and more aggressive tension between race crews.  Non-Japanese automobile racers & car clubs started to appear from far outside the Gardena, Torrance, & South Bay communities and in approx. circa 1983-86 Import racers and midnight racers started to meet at another local restaurant called "Naugles," which was located on Western Ave & and 186th street. Naugles was the "1st obvious step" that import racing was now gaining popularity in other Southern California communities.
The import scene grew exponentially in the 1990s and 2000s with more Japanese imports internationally, better performance, and media and cultural influences such as the Fast and the Furious movie series and Need for Speed video games. The growing scene was headlined by the flagship Japanese halo sports cars such as the Toyota Supra, Nissan Skyline GT-R, Mazda RX-7, and Acura NSX. Other cars such as the Mitsubishi 3000GT, Nissan Z, Honda S2000, Toyota MR2, Nissan Silvia, Mitsubishi Lancer Evolution, and Subaru Impreza WRX were all successful entrants in the booming scene.
Street Import racing venues and street meet-up locations in nearby cities such as Carson, Ca. and Long Beach, Ca. eventually arose from the original Meiji Market Location, and then came huge drag racing events at Palmdale, California often packed in over 10,000 spectators per day. Racers like Stephan Papadakis, Ed Bergenholtz, Myles Bautista and Eric Sebastian on the West Coast dominated the first import drag racing circuit IDRC (Battle of the Imports) in the mid 1990s.  Show car clubs became a huge factor within the import scene: Southern California had Team Macross 7, Team Outkast, Team Kosoku, Northern California had SVP, Sinister Racing, Team Flipspeed in the East Coast (New Jersey, Toronto). In the South, Team Himitsujigen and Team Dangerous (Texas) and Team  Hawaii had Midnight Racing and Alpha Project, Guam had teams like Lowered 2 Perfection and Toys R Us, while the East Coast had the still-active Jade Crew.

The Japanese racing scene can be seen in the anime series Initial D, which focuses mainly on mountain pass-racing and Wangan Midnight which deals with high-speed expressway racing.

Japanese products
Another part of the import scene is Japanese products that either explore or detail such racing, often introducing new fans to the scene. These are usually found through DVDs and books.

The Japanese domestic market supplies high quality parts and brands for tuning Japanese cars. It is made up of various associations working together to supply products to street racers and tuners.

DVDs
Some of the more well known DVDs about the scene, apart from the anime series mentioned above, include:

Best Motoring
Hot Version
Torque Video Magazine
Video Option (alternatively known as JDM Option)
Drift Tengoku

Anime and manga
Two Japanese anime and manga have been attributed to the growing import scene in some form or another. A common theme in both is that characters that are depicted underdogs with hidden and untapped talent drive what amount to antiquated cars that many would deem either ready for the scrapheap or underpowered compared to much better tuned and modified cars.

The anime and manga Initial D stars Takumi Fujiwara as he is introduced to touge (mountain pass racing) after it is found that he has a natural ability to race his father's specially tuned Toyota AE86 Sprinter Trueno. With his amazing skill he is able to defeat Mazda RX-7s, Nissan Skyline GT-Rs and Mitsubishi Lancer Evolutions. With this spawned several arcade games, which utilizes cars from the manga, plus other cars associated with touge racing. The cars are set up more to take the tight mountain passes and emphasis is placed more on driver ability rather than speed and power. The series at first gained popularity via fansubs and bootlegs, until Tokyopop translated both the anime and manga. However, some have criticized Tokyopop's translation of the property, with major changes to both the story and the content. After Tokyopop lost the license to Initial D in 2009, Funimation picked up the license to Initial D and re-released the first four seasons of the anime, with new subtitles and dubs more faithful to the original.

On the opposite spectrum, Wangan Midnight focuses on the relatively wide Shuto Expressway of Tokyo. Akio Asakura is a high school student who likes to race on the Wangan highway. After being defeated by a doctor (and a racer as well), Tatsuya Shima's Blackbird (a Porsche 964), he accidentally acquires a monstrously powerful Nissan Fairlady Z (S30) known as The Devil Z. All but one of its previous owners were mysteriously killed in traffic accidents involving the Z, but he quickly makes a name for himself on the Wangan. The cars are designed for speed and power, and are based on the exploits of street racers who used the Wangan as their own personal racetrack. While not as well known as Initial D, the series gained a cult following after the arcade game Wangan Midnight Maximum Tune was import to the United States by Namco as a replacement for Ridge Racer V: Arcade Battle.

See also

Grey import vehicles
VIP style
Art car
Boy racer
Cruising (driving)
Drag racing
Drifting (motorsport)
Engine tuning
Hot hatch
Kustom Kulture
Import model
Rice burner
Sport compact
Stance (vehicle)
Sleeper (car)
Street racing
Japanese domestic market
Japanese used vehicle exporting

References

Asian-American culture
Vehicle modification

es:Tuneo